Carey Young (born 1970) is a visual artist whose work is often inspired by law, politics and economics. The tools, language and architectures of these fields act as material for her videos, text works, performances and photographs, often developing from the professional cultures she explores. In her early video works, she donned attire appropriate to the business and legal worlds, enacting scenarios which examine and question each institution's power to shape society and individual identity. Since 2002, Young developed a large body of work addressing and critiquing law in relation to ideas of site, gender and performance. Young teaches at the Slade School of Fine Art in London where she is an Associate Professor in Fine Art.

Early life and education
Born in Lusaka in Zambia in 1970, Young grew up in Manchester, England and studied at Manchester Polytechnic, the University of Brighton and photography at the Royal College of Art in London. She has dual US/UK citizenship and lives and works in London, UK.

Exhibitions and themes
Young's work has been exhibited at museums and galleries all over the world. Highlights include solo exhibitions at Modern Art Oxford, Dallas Museum of Art, Migros Museum of Contemporary Art, The Power Plant, The Contemporary Art Museum St. Louis, and inclusion in group exhibitions at Centre Pompidou, Tate Britain, the Whitechapel Art Gallery, the Hayward Gallery, Secession, Kunstverein München, Mass MOCA, MoMA PS1, Jeu de Paume and the Venice, Moscow, Taipei, Tirana and Busan biennials.

Young's work is included in the public collections of the Centre Pompidou, Arts Council England, Dallas Museum of Art, and Tate. She is represented by Paula Cooper Gallery, New York.

Young's projects often center on ideas of the body, language, rhetoric, and systems of power. Since 2002, her work has shifted into an interest in the legal imagination. 'Disclaimer', a 2003 exhibition at the Henry Moore Institute examined legal disclaimers as a form of negative space. In 2005, she showed 'Consideration', a series of works exploring the connections between contract law and performance art at Paula Cooper Gallery in New York as part of the PERFORMA05 Biennial. RoseLee Goldberg described the works in this show as "dealing with the overwhelming power of the law." This is seen again in 'Declared Void' (2005) which explores the relationship between the law and the constitutional identity of individuals.

Her 2013 exhibition "Legal Fictions" at Migros Museum in Zurich was described by Mousse Magazine as featuring: "law-based works [that] address the monolithic power of the legal system. The artist examines law as a conceptual and abstract space in which power, rights, and authority are played out through varying forms of performance and language. With the drafting assistance of legal advisers, her works often take the form of experimental but functional legal instruments such as contracts, and also employ media such as video, installation, and text." 

Her 2017 video installation 'Palais de Justice', at Paula Cooper Gallery was described by critic Jeffrey Kastner as:  “quietly stunning … vividly proposes a juridical world as it might otherwise be, a form of the Law that may someday be possible.” Johanna Fateman, Artforum, described the work as:  "a transfixing (...) speculative fiction", a "tantalising (...) novel mockup of a post-patriarchal legal system."

Selected solo exhibitions

2023
Modern Art Oxford

2019
La Loge, Brussels; 
Towner, Eastbourne

2017
Palais de Justice, Paula Cooper Gallery, New York;
The New Architecture, Dallas Museum of Art, Dallas

2013
Legal Fictions, Migros Museum für Gegenwartskunst, Zurich;
Let the World Speak for Itself, Le Quartier Centre d'Art Contemporain, Quimper

2010
Memento Park, Eastside Projects, Birmingham (and tour to Cornerhouse, Manchester and MiMA, Middlesbrough);
Contracting Universe, Paula Cooper Gallery, New York

2009
Carey Young: Uncertain Contracts, Museum of Art, Rhode Island School of Design, Providence;
Speech Acts, Contemporary Art Museum, St Louis;
Counter Offer, The Power Plant, Toronto

2008
Mutual Release, Thomas Dane, London

2007
If/Then, Paula Cooper Gallery, New York;
Speechcraft, Modern Art Oxford, Oxford (performance);
Consideration, Midway Contemporary Art, Minneapolis

2006
Image Transfer, Umea Art Academy, Umea, curated by Maria Lind

2005
Consideration, Paula Cooper Gallery, New York (part of Performa05 Biennial);
The Representative, solo presentation, IBID Projects booth, Zoo Art Fair, London;
Disclaimer, IBID Projects, London
Carey Young, Trafo Gallery, Budapest.

2004
Disclaimer, Henry Moore Institute, Leeds;
Participant Observer, participative workshop on art and economics, IASPIS, Stockholm;
Carey Young, Index, Stockholm;
Viral Marketing, (The Revolution is Us! & Getting Things Done When You're Not in Charge), Kunstverein München

2003
Optimum Performance, A Short History of Performance - Part II, Whitechapel Gallery, London; 
Carey Young, IBID Projects, Vilnius;
Viral Marketing, Kunstverein Munich;

2001 - 2002
Business as Usual, John Hansard Gallery, Southampton, Angel Row, Nottingham; Firstsite, Colchester (curated and organised by Film & Video Umbrella)

2001
My Megastore, site-specific works at Virgin Megastore, London;
Carey Young, Video Project Space, Wilkinson Gallery, London

2000
Nothing Ventured, fig-1, London (exh. cat.)

Other publications
Young's work has been included in numerous publications and a number of videos and audio recordings.

Selected periodicals
 Fateman, Johanna, "Carey Young at Paula Cooper", Artforum, Nov 2017
 Farago, Jason, 'Palais de Justice', New York Times, 20 Sept 2017
 Bryan-Wilson, Julia. 'Inside Job: Julia Bryan-Wilson on the art of Carey Young,' Artforum, Oct 2010
 Bell, Natalie, 'Carey Young', Art Papers, March/April 2008
 Schwabsky, Barry, "Carey Young", Artforum, Sept 2005
 Smith, Roberta, "The Passions of the Good Citizen", The New York Times, 3 May 2002

Web articles
 Kastner, Jeffrey, Garage magazine (Vice magazine), Oct 2017 
 Bourbon, Matthew, 'Critic's Pick: Carey Young at Dallas Museum of Art', Artforum.com, Feb 2017 
 Shore, Robert, and Young, Carey, 'Interview with Carey Young: “Friendly, Honest, Straightforward”: Meditations on Power', Elephant magazine, Feb 2017 
 Goldberg, RoseLee and Stallman, Nick, "Conversations..with RoseLee Goldberg', New York Foundation for the Arts, 2005 
 Baker, R.C., 'The Road to Dystopia', Village Voice, 2007

Books
 Buskirk, Martha; Gygax, Raphael; Young, Carey and Zolghadr, Tirdad, in 'Carey Young: Subject to Contract', JRP Ringier and Migros Museum of Contemporary Art, Zurich, London, 2013
 Farquharson, Alex; Gillick, Liam and Young, Carey; Kelsey, John and Millar, Jeremy, in 'Carey Young, Incorporated', John Hansard Gallery and Film & Video Umbrella, London, 2002
 Nochlin, Linda, in Global Feminisms, Brooklyn Museum, New York, 2007
 Bourriaud, Nicolas, in Moscow Biennale 7 catalogue, Moscow, 2007
 Hoffman, Jens in 'Institutional Critique and After', edited by John C. Welchman, JRP/Ringier, Zürich, 2006
 Newman, Michael, in 'How to Improve the World', Hayward Gallery, London, 2006
 Townsend, Chris, 'New Art from London', Thames and Hudson, London, 2006
 Farquharson, Alex, Schlieker, Andrea, and Mahony, Emma in 'British Art Show 6', Hayward Gallery Publishing, London, 2005
 Latour, Bruno and Weibel, Peter, 'Making Things Public', ZKM and the MIT Press, Karlsruhe & Cambridge, 2005
 Hoffmann, Jens and Jonas, Joan, 'Art Works: Perform', Thames and Hudson, London, 2005
 Kimbell, Lucy (ed), 'New Media Art: Practice and Content in the UK 1994–2004', Arts Council of England / Cornerhouse publications, London, 2004

Videos about the artist 

 Centre Pompidou (Artist talk in English, with French translation,17 May 2010; duration 1hr 51 mins)
 Contemporary Art Museum St. Louis (introductory video by curator, 2010; duration 6 mins 45 secs)

References

External links
 Artist's web site
 Artfacts.net artist ranking
 Centre Pompidou artist talk, in English and French
 Tate video recording of talk featuring the artist
 Selected works plus bibliographical and biographical info on Paula Cooper Gallery website

1970 births
Alumni of Manchester Metropolitan University
Alumni of the University of Brighton
Alumni of the Royal College of Art
British women artists
British video artists
British performance artists
American video artists
American women video artists
Living people
American installation artists
British installation artists
Institutional Critique artists
British contemporary artists
21st-century American women